144 (one hundred [and] forty-four) is the natural number following 143 and preceding 145. 144 is a dozen dozens, or one gross.

In mathematics
144 is the twelfth Fibonacci number, and the largest one to also be a square number (which is also its index in the Fibonacci sequence), following 89 and preceding 233. 

As a square number, 12 × 12 = 144, and if each number is reversed, the equation still holds: 21 × 21 = 441. 169 shares this property: 13 × 13 = 169, 31 × 31 = 961.

144 is the smallest number with exactly 15 divisors, but it is not highly composite since the smaller number 120 has 16 divisors.

144 is divisible by the value of its φ function, which returns 48 in this case. Also, there are 21 solutions to the equation φ(x) = 144, more than any integer below 144, making it a highly totient number.

144 = 27 + 84 + 110 + 133, the smallest number whose fifth power is a sum of four (smaller) fifth powers. This solution was found in 1966 by L. J. Lander and T. R. Parkin, and disproved Euler's sum of powers conjecture.

144 is in base 10 a sum-product number, as well as the sum of a twin prime pair (71 + 73). It is also a Harshad number, since 1 + 4 + 4 = 9, which divides 144.

The maximum determinant in a 9 by 9 matrix of zeroes and ones is 144.

A regular decagon has an internal angle of 144 degrees. 

The snub 24-cell, one of three semiregular polytopes in the fourth dimension, contains a total of 144 polyhedral cells: 120 regular tetrahedra and 24 regular icosahedra.

In sports
 College Hoops Net (CHN) annual ranking of the Top 144 NCAA college basketball teams in 144 days.
 The CFL record for career touchdown receptions, held by Milt Stegall of the Winnipeg Blue Bombers.

In other fields
144 is also:
 The year AD 144 or 144 BC.
 144 AH is a year in the Islamic calendar that corresponds to 761–762 AD.
 144 Vibilia is a dark, large Main belt asteroid.
 The measurement, in cubits, of the wall of New Jerusalem shown by the seventh angel (Bible, Revelation 21:17).
 The atomic number of unquadquadium, a temporary chemical element.
 The Intel 8086 instruction for no operation (NOP).
 The emergency phone number for animals in danger in the Netherlands.
 The telephone number for directory assistance in Israel.
 The emergency telephone number for medical emergencies in Austria. and Switzerland.
 Psalm 144.
 Sonnet 144 by William Shakespeare.
 Rule 144A, of the U.S. Securities Act of 1933 deals with private resales of restricted securities.
 Form 144 (December 6, 2007), amends Rule 144 under the United States Securities Act of 1933 which regulates the resale of restricted securities and securities held by affiliates.
 Section 144 of Bangladesh Code of Criminal Procedure prohibits assembly of five or more persons, public meetings, and carrying firearms.
 Tupolev Tu-144 was the first supersonic transport aircraft (SST), constructed under the direction of the Soviet Tupolev.
 1:144 scale is a scale used for some scale models.
 The number of square inches in a square foot.
 Mahjong is usually played with a set of 144 tiles.
 144 (film), 2015 Indian Tamil film.

See also
 List of highways numbered 144
 United Nations Security Council Resolution 144
 United States Supreme Court cases, Volume 144
 P.S. 144 Col. Jeromus Remsen School, Forest Hills, Queens, New York
 144th Delaware General Assembly

References

 Wells, D. The Penguin Dictionary of Curious and Interesting Numbers. London: Penguin Group. (1987): 139–140.

External links

 The Natural Number 144\
 Hand-me-down christening gown that's 144 years old

Integers